Enigma Force may refer to:

 The Enigma Force (comics), which creates Captain Universe
 Enigma Force (video game)
 Enigma Force: a strike force of the United Liberation Front of Asom